Pougues-les-Eaux is a railway station in Pougues-les-Eaux, Bourgogne-Franche-Comté, France. The station is located on the Moret-Lyon railway. The station is served by Intercités (long distance) and TER (local) services operated by SNCF.

Train services

The station is served by intercity and regional trains towards Cosne-sur-Loire, Nevers and Paris.

intercity services (Intercités) Paris - Montargis - Nevers
local service (TER Bourgogne-Franche-Comté) Cosne-sur-Loire - La Charité - Nevers

References

Railway stations in Nièvre